Eastview is a rural neighbourhood in the east end of Kingston, Ontario. It is located in the former Pittsburgh Township south of Ontario Highway 2, opposite Treasure Island on the Saint Lawrence River.

See also
 Vanier, Ontario (formerly Eastview) in Ottawa
 List of communities in Ontario

References

Communities in Frontenac County